The Rushville Shale is a geologic formation in Ohio. It dates back to the Mississippian.

References
 Generalized Stratigraphic Chart for Ohio

Carboniferous Ohio